Wrestle-1 (W-1)  was a Japanese professional wrestling promotion that operated from 2013 until 2020. Wrestle-1 personnel consisted of professional wrestlers, ring announcers, referees, and trainees.

Roster at time of closure

Wrestlers

Trainees

Staff

Notable alumni

Men

Bob Sapp
Masakatsu Funaki
Masato Tanaka
Minoru Tanaka
Nosawa Rongai
Jay Bradley
Jiro Kuroshio
Kai
Kaji Tomato
Rob Terry
Ryota Hama
Seiya Sanada
Taiyō Kea
Tajiri
Zodiac

Joshi talent

Hana Kimura
Hanako Nakamori
Mika Iwata
Natsumi Maki
Sachie Abe
Saori Anou

External links
Official roster page at W-1.co.jp 

Wrestle-1
Lists of professional wrestling personnel